Robert H. Coburn (March 23, 1911 – February 3, 2001) was an American professional basketball player. He played college basketball for Ohio State University. Colburn then played in the National Basketball League for the Dayton Metropolitans during the 1937–38 season and averaged 7.3 points per game. In his post-basketball life, Colburn became a high school teacher and basketball coach.

References

1911 births
2001 deaths
American men's basketball players
Basketball players from Dayton, Ohio
Dayton Metropolitans players
Forwards (basketball)
High school basketball coaches in the United States
Ohio State Buckeyes men's basketball players
People from Lockland, Ohio
Xavier University alumni